Rakshit Shetty (born 6 June 1983) is an Indian actor, film producer, writer and filmmaker of Kannada cinema. He is the recipient of two Filmfare Awards South.

Early life
Shetty was born in Udupi on 6 June 1983 in a Tulu-speaking Bunt family. He completed his schooling at his hometown. During his schooling days he was an avid Pili Nalike dancer, a folk dance in the Tulu Nadu region. This made him provide a major role for the dancers in his 2014 film Ulidavaru Kandanthe. Before starting his movie career, he completed his bachelor's degree in Electronics and Communications  engineering at N.M.A.M. Institute of Technology, Nitte, Karkala. After graduating, he worked as a software professional for two years before becoming an actor starting in theatre.

Career

Shetty made his acting debut in 2010 with Nam Areal Ond Dina, it didn't garner much popularity or success to him. Later, the romance-comedy 2013 film Simple Agi Ondh Love Story proved to be a breakthrough film for him after which he directed and starred in the crime-drama Ulidavaru Kandanthe in 2014. The film garnered widespread critical acclaim and won him the Karnataka State Film Award for Director's First Time Best Film and the Filmfare Award South for Best Director. The film holds cult status among Kannada audience. He followed it by starring in Ricky, Vaastu Prakaara (2015) and the critical success Godhi Banna Sadharana Mykattu (2016). Shetty achieved further success with the 2016 college drama Kirik Party which he wrote and produced, it was a critical and commercial success. In 2022, Shetty was seen in 777 Charlie, with his co-star, Charlie, a Labrador; Shetty produced 777 Charlie with the direction of Kiranraj K, under Paramvah Studios. It got released on 10th of June, 2022. The shooting process of this film took more than five years. The film focuses on the relationship between pet and pet lovers.

Directors Pawan Kumar, Anup Bhandari, Hemanth M. Rao, Manjunatha Somashekara Reddy (Mansore), Rishab Shetty and Raj B. Shetty along with Rakshit have been credited by the media and in the Kannada film industry as having begun the new wave of filmmaking. Through his career, he has established himself in the Kannada film industry.

Personal life 
Shetty began dating his co-star Rashmika Mandanna during making of Kirik Party, and the couple got engaged on 3 July 2017 in a private ceremony in her hometown of Virajpet. The couple mutually broke off their engagement in September 2018, citing compatibility issues.

Filmography

As actor

other crew positions

Awards and nominations

Notes

References

External links

Indian male film actors
Living people
Male actors in Kannada cinema
Kannada film directors
Tulu people
Mangaloreans
People from Udupi
1983 births
Indian Hindus
21st-century Indian male actors
Kannada film producers
Film producers from Karnataka
Film directors from Karnataka
Bigg Boss contestants